The Cattai National Park is a protected national park that is located in the Hawkesbury region of Sydney, New South Wales, in eastern Australia. It includes Mitchell Park and Hope Farm.

Location and features

Part of the national park was an original First Fleet grant and the park contains important historic and archaeological resources, including a homestead built in the 1820s, ruins of a
stone windmill which is thought to be the oldest industrial building in Australia, convict-built dry stone walls, and a range of other features which reflect changes in the place since the early nineteenth century. The national park also contains a number of Aboriginal sites which are of importance to our understanding of the Cattai area prior to European settlement.

The Cattai Homestead, which was constructed around 1820, and its curtilage is listed by the National Trust and the Australian Heritage Commission. The Hope Farm Mill on Hope Farm, which is also listed on the Register of the National Estate, was probably constructed around 1806 and is believed to be the oldest industrial site in Australia.

See also

 Protected areas of New South Wales
 Cattai, New South Wales

References

External links

 
 
 
 

National parks of New South Wales
Protected areas established in 1992
1992 establishments in Australia
Hawkesbury River